Four simultaneous by-elections were held in Samoa on 29 July 2011. They followed on from the general election on 4 March, after which the results in several constituencies had been challenged. The Supreme Court voided 
 the election of Va'ai Papu Vailupe (of the Tautua Samoa Party) in the Vaisigano No.1 constituency due to bribery and treating,
 the election of  Alai'asa Filipo Schwartz Hunt (elected as an independent, but who had then joined the Human Rights Protection Party) in the Anoamaa East constituency due to corruption,
 the election of Taua Kitiona Seuala (of the Human Rights Protection Party) in the Aleipata Itupa I Luga constituency due to corruption, and
 the election of Tavu'i Tiafau Salevao (of the Human Rights Protection Party) in the Satupaitea constituency due to bribery and treating.

Consequently, by-elections were held for those four seats to the Legislative Assembly. The governing Human Rights Protection Party won all four by-elections, giving it a total of 37 seats out of 49 in the Assembly, one more than it had had following the general election. The opposition Tautua Samoa Party was left with 12 seats.

Results
The results were as follows.

Results at the prior general election

References

By-elections to the Legislative Assembly of Samoa
Samoa by-elections
by-elections